Bidonì is a comune (municipality) in the Province of Oristano in the Italian region Sardinia, located about  north of Cagliari and about  northeast of Oristano.

Bidonì borders the following municipalities: Ghilarza, Nughedu Santa Vittoria, Sedilo, Sorradile.

References

External links
 Official website

Cities and towns in Sardinia